This is a list of the National Register of Historic Places listings in Jeff Davis County, Texas.

This is intended to be a complete list of properties and districts listed on the National Register of Historic Places in Jeff Davis County, Texas. There are five properties listed on the National Register in the county including one site listed as both a National Historic Site and a National Historic Landmark. Three sites are also listed as Recorded Texas Historic Landmarks including one that is a State Antiquities Landmark.

Current listings

The publicly disclosed locations of National Register properties and districts may be seen in a mapping service provided.

|}

See also

National Register of Historic Places listings in Texas
Recorded Texas Historic Landmarks in Jeff Davis County

References

External links

Jeff Davis County, Texas
Jeff Davis County